Man Ray was an American Dada and surrealist artist.

Man Ray may also refer to:
Man Ray (SpongeBob SquarePants), a villain in the animated television series SpongeBob SquarePants
Man Ray (bar), a restaurant-bar in Paris, France
Man Ray, the name of the dog photographed repeatedly by photographer William Wegman
"Man Ray," a song by The Futureheads from their 2004 album The Futureheads
Manray, a nightclub in Cambridge, Massachusetts, U.S.

Man Ray, an Argentine rock duo of singer Hilda Lizarazu and guitarist Tito Losavio